Al Madeena Islamic complex (مجمع مدينة الاسلامى), also known as Al Madeena Yatheem Khana (دار الايتام) is an Islamic university in Mangalore, Karnataka, India, established on 17 March 1994. It has 500 students including 110 orphans studying Qur'an, Hadith, Fiq’h, Arts, Science and Technology under different institutes. The institution was founded by Sheikhuna Sharaful Ulama Manjanady Abbas Musliyar.Kanthapuram A. P. Aboobacker Musliyar is its present President.

Minority institution
The complex, consisting of religious educational center and orphanage, is a Muslim minority institution. An orphan house, Islamic college (Dars), English medium school, high school, Hifzul quran, tailoring training center are part of the complex.

Institutions under Al madeena 
 Yatheem khana (Orphanage)
Sharia college (Islamic studies)
Boarding Madrasa
Islamic Library
English Medium School
High School
Tailoring Institution
Shopping Complex
Community Hall
al madeena dawa college
al madeena hiflul quran college
al madeena womens college
al madeena womens shareeath college
al madeena north karnataka home
al madeena computer technology services

See also
 Abbas Msuliyar
 List of educational institutions in Mangalore
 Markazu Saqafathi Sunniya

References

External links
 Udayavani
Official website

Islamic universities and colleges in India
Universities and colleges in Mangalore
Orphanages in India